Artgal mac Cathail (died 791) was a King of Connacht from the Uí Briúin branch of the Connachta. He was the son of Cathal mac Muiredaig Muillethan (died 735), a previous king and brother of Dub-Indrecht mac Cathail (died 768). He was of the Síl Cathail sept of the Ui Briun and ruled from 777 to 782.

In 777 The Ui Fiachrach who are from now on excluded from the throne slaughtered the Calraige. In 778 Artgal slaughtered the Ui Maine at the Battle of Mag Dairben. 

In 780 the third enforcement of the law of Saint Commán of Roscommon and the abbot Áedán was imposed on the three Connachta. Artgal abdicated in 782 and went on a pilgrimage to Iona the following year where he died in 791.

His son Cináed mac Artgail (died 792) was also a king of Connacht.

See also
Kings of Connacht

References

External links
CELT: Corpus of Electronic Texts at University College Cork

791 deaths
Kings of Connacht
People from County Roscommon
8th-century Irish monarchs
Year of birth unknown
Monarchs who abdicated